Marcellino Victor John Lefrandt, known professionally as Marcellino Lefrandt (born July 19, 1974), is an Indonesian actor and lecturer. He became popular starring in the soap opera Bidadari in 2000–2005. He played Mr. Bagus, father of Lala (who played by Marshanda).

Career
Lefrandt became publicly known since becoming a finalist in 'Aneka Ria'. He became a catwalk and photo model. He starred in films, including Jackie, Jacklyn, and Deru Debu alongside Willy Dozan. He has also worked as a singer, appearing in the group Amartya, together with Anjasmara, Gunawan, and Tia Ivanka.

Lefrandt returned to acting in 2009, playing in the film Jamila dan Sang Presiden, released in April. Also in 2009, he accepted a position as a lecturer in the law faculty at the Sam Ratulangi University, Manado. Lefrandt is also Vice President of Skylar Comics.

Personal life
Lefrandt married his girlfriend, Dewi Rezer, a former VJ for MTV Indonesia. They were married at Hotel Tirta Bali International, Uluwatu, Jimbaran, Bali on July 18, 2007. They have two children. Lefrandt practices the martial art of judo.

Filmography

Film

Television

Television film

References

External links
  Profil Marcellino Kapanlagi.com
  Bio Marcellino Lefrandt Wowkeren.com
 

1974 births
Living people
Minahasa people
People from Manado
21st-century Indonesian male singers
Indonesian male models
Indonesian male actors
Indonesian male television actors
Indo people
Indonesian people of American descent
Indonesian Roman Catholics
Male actors from North Sulawesi
Sam Ratulangi University alumni
Academic staff of Sam Ratulangi University